The Gdański Bridge is a six-span steel truss bridge, 406.5 m long and 17 m wide, across the Vistula in Warsaw, Poland. 

It opened on 31 July 1959 after three years of construction. It has two decks: the upper deck carries a four-lane road with sidewalks, while the lower one has two tram tracks, a cycle lane and a footpath.

The bridge was built upon the supports of the Citadel Rail Bridge which had been destroyed during World War II.

In 1997-1998 the bridge underwent reconstruction. It was painted green and the lower level was fitted with colour bulbs for illumination at night.

See also
 Śląsko-Dąbrowski Bridge
 Łazienkowski Bridge
 Poniatowski Bridge
 Siekierkowski Bridge
 Świętokrzyski Bridge

External links

 
 Entry at MostyPolskie.pl

Bridges completed in 1959
Bridges in Warsaw
Truss bridges
Road bridges in Poland
Double-decker bridges